The Commission on Concealed Mass Graves in Serbia is an office of the Serbian Government whose task is to find and document mass grave sites from the Second World War and the period immediately after it. It was established in 2009.

In 2010, the commission announced that its first investigations would be in Zaječar in eastern Serbia. On April 29, 2010 all documents relating to the commission's work were unsealed from secrecy.

After one year of operation, the commission announced that it had found 190 potential grave sites and had collected information on over 59,000 victims. The commission has prompted Serbian president Boris Tadić to call for a committee of Serbian and Hungarian academics to investigate war crimes committed by both sides in Vojvodina during the war.

Members
 Slobodan Radovanović - Chairman of the Commission
 Slobodan Homen
 Ivan Bulatović
 Blagoje Peruničić

Organization
A local branch of the commission has been established for the Zaječar District.

Exhumations
Boljevac - In 2010, the remains of at least 26 people were discovered in a mass grave.

Findings
By November, 2010: 190 potential grave sites and collected information on over 18,000 victims.
By December, 2011: 206 potential graves sites and collected information on over 36,000 victims.

See also
Commission on Concealed Mass Graves in Slovenia
Committee for the Marking and Maintenance of Graves from World War II and the Post-war

References

External links
Commission home page

Government of Serbia
2009 establishments in Serbia